Talento FOX is a Latin American singing competition television series broadcast on FOX. It premiered on August 22, 2018 and aims to find currently unsigned singing talent from all over Latin America (professional and amateur) contested by aspiring singers, drawn from public auditions. The competition not only looks for talent, but it also aims to overcome contestants' past personal experiences and fears. The winner receives record deal with Sony Music Argentina to record a studio album, and becomes exclusive artist of Fox Latin America.

The series employs a panel of three judges or "directors" who guide the artists' performances. Each director is concerned with a particular aspect: Diego Torres with vocal technique and perfectioning, Lali Espósito with body expression and stage performance, and Wisin with artistic projection. The series is hosted by Alejandro Fantino.

On November 21, 2018, Francisco Vázquez was crowned winner of Talento Fox.

Selection process and format
The competition begins with the "Selection Phase." The directors watch a video of each contestant introducing themselves and narrating their life stories before performing. Once the video finishes, the contestants start their performances from inside a capsule inside the stage as to allow the directors to focus only on the voice. They have one minute to impress the directors and encourage them to press their button or "disc". To officially enter the competition or the "Talento FOX factory", the contestant needs the approval of the three directors. With only two directors pressing their buttons, the capsule is lifted up and the stage forms stairs from which the contestant descends to face the audience. If this happens, the contestant has the opportunity to convince the lasting director to press their button. However, if any or only one director press their buttons in the one-minute span time, they are denied any opportunity to enter the factory.

The twenty-five contestants eventually selected are trained in the "Factory", where they work with professionals to improve their singing, dancing and performing skills. The "Transphormation Phase" consists of four episodes in which six or seven contestants perform a song individually. At the end of the episode, the directors select three contestants to advance to the next phase.

The twelve remaining contestants are arranged in duets to compete in the "Competition Phase", which consists of two episodes. In each one, three duets (six contestants) perform a song, and the judges chooses the best duet to advance to the next phase. The four remaining contestants then perform a different song, and the directors now chose only two of them, from the same or from different duets. The first chosen duet get to perform at the end of the episode.

Selection Phase
Color key

Episode 1 (Aug. 22)

Episode 2 (Aug. 29)

Episode 3 (Sep. 5)

Episode 4 (Sep. 12)

Transformation Phase
Color key:

Episode 5 (Sep. 26)

Episode 6 (Oct. 3)

Episode 7 (Oct. 10)

Episode 8 (Oct. 17)

Competition Phase: Duets
Color key:

Episode 9 (Oct. 24)

Episode 10 (Oct. 31)

Quarter-finals

Episode 11 (Nov. 7)
Color key

Semifinals
Color key:

Episode 12 (Nov. 14)

Finale
Color key:

Episode 13 (Nov. 21)

Non-competition performances

Reception

References

Spanish-language television shows
Fox Broadcasting Company original programming
2010s Argentine television series